The A7V was a heavy tank introduced by Germany in 1918 during World War I. One hundred chassis were ordered in early 1917, ten to be finished as fighting vehicles with armoured bodies, and the remainder as Überlandwagen cargo carriers. The number to be armoured was later increased to 20. They were used in action from March to October 1918, and were the only tanks produced by Germany in World War I to be used in combat.

History
After the first British tanks appeared on the Western Front, in September 1916, the German War Ministry formed a committee, under the auspices of its Allgemeines Kriegsdepartement, Abteilung 7 Verkehrswesen ("General War Department, Section 7, Transportation"), to investigate tank development.

The project to design and build the first German tank was placed under the direction of Joseph Vollmer, one of Germany's foremost automobile designers. The running gear was based on the American Holt tractor, copied from examples loaned by the Austro-Hungarian Army. After initial plans were shared with the army in December 1916, the design was extended to be a universal chassis that could be used as a base for both a tank and unarmoured Überlandwagen ("over-land vehicle") cargo carriers.

The first prototype was completed by Daimler-Motoren-Gesellschaft at Berlin-Marienfelde and tested on 30 April 1917. A wooden mockup of a final version was completed in May 1917 and demonstrated in Mainz with 10 tons of ballast to simulate the weight of the armor. During final design, the rear-facing cannon was removed and the number of machine-guns was increased to six. The first pre-production A7V was produced in September 1917, followed by the first production model in October 1917. The tanks were given to Assault Tank Units 1 and 2, founded on 20 September 1917, each with five officers and 109 non-commissioned officers and soldiers.

Naming
The tank's name was derived from that of its parent organization, Allgemeines Kriegsdepartement, Abteilung 7 (Verkehrswesen) (General War Department, Section 7, Transport). In German, the tank was called Sturmpanzerwagen (roughly "armoured assault vehicle").

Design

The tank had 20 mm of steel plate at the sides, 30 mm at the front and 10 mm for the roof; however, the steel was not hardened armour plate, which reduced its effectiveness. It was sufficient to stop machine-gun and rifle fire, but not larger calibre rounds.

The crew officially consisted of at least 17 soldiers and one officer: commander (officer, typically a lieutenant), driver, mechanic, mechanic/signaller, 12 infantrymen (six machine gunners, six loaders), and two artillerymen (main gunner and loader). A7Vs often went into action with as many as 25 men on board.

Armament

The A7V was armed with six 7.92 mm MG08 machine guns and a 5.7 cm Maxim-Nordenfelt cannon mounted at the front. Some of these cannons were of British manufacture and had been captured in Belgium early in the war; others were captured in Russia in 1918 and appear to have included some Russian-made copies.

Some A7Vs originally were built with two forward-facing machine guns instead of a 57 mm gun. Most were converted to carry a 57 mm before entering service. Number 501, Gretchen, took part in the action at St. Quentin before her 57 mm was fitted.

Ammunition
Officially, it carried 180 shells for the 57 mm gun, of which 90 were canister, 54 were armor-piercing, and 36 were high-explosive; in practice, however, A7V crews stowed up to 300 57 mm rounds for combat.

Propulsion

Power came from two centrally mounted Daimler 4-cylinder petrol engines delivering  each; the A7V carried  of fuel. The 24 wheel suspension was individually sprung – an advantage over the unsprung British tanks.

Compared to that of other World War I tanks, the A7V's road speed was quite high, but the vehicle had very poor off-road capability and a high centre of gravity, which made it prone to getting stuck or overturning on steep slopes. The large overhang at the front and the low ground clearance meant that trenches or very muddy areas were impassable. However, in open terrain, the A7V could be used to some success, and offered more firepower than the armoured cars that were available.

Combat history

St. Quentin Canal
The A7V was first used in combat on 21 March 1918. Five tanks of Abteilung I (Detachment I) under the command of Hauptmann Greiff were deployed north of the St. Quentin Canal. Three of the A7Vs suffered mechanical failures before they entered combat; the remaining pair helped stop a minor British breakthrough in the area, but otherwise saw little combat that day.

Villers-Bretonneux

Three detachments (Abteilungen) of tanks were assigned to an attack in April 1918 at Villers-Bretonneux at the head of the four German divisions spread over a  front. Two tanks broke down en route, but the 13 that saw action achieved some success, and the British recorded that their lines were broken by the tanks.

The first tank-against-tank combat in history took place on 24 April 1918 when three A7Vs (including chassis number 561, known as Nixe) taking part in an attack with infantry incidentally met three British Mark IVs (two female machine gun-armed tanks and one male with two 6-pounder guns) near Villers-Bretonneux. During the battle, tanks on both sides were damaged. According to the British lead tank commander, Second Lieutenant Frank Mitchell, the female Mk IVs fell back after being damaged by armour-piercing bullets. They were unable to damage the A7Vs with their own machine guns. Mitchell then attacked the lead German tank, commanded by Second Lieutenant Wilhelm Biltz, with the 6-pounders of his own tank and knocked it out. He hit it three times, and killed five of the crew when they bailed out. He stated that he then went on to rout some infantry with case shot. The two remaining A7Vs in turn withdrew. As Mitchell's tank withdrew from action, seven British Whippet tanks also engaged the German infantry. Three of these were knocked out in the battle, and it is unclear if any of them engaged the retreating German tanks but they did carry out an attack on two German battalions in the open to the rear causing them to break and flee.  Mitchell's tank lost a track towards the end of the battle due to damage from an exploding mortar shell and was abandoned. The damaged A7V limped back to the German lines, but eventually broke down. It was later destroyed by a German demolition squad, to prevent its capture and reuse by the Allies.

A counter attack later re-established the Allied line, by which time three A7Vs were out of action in No Man's Land or behind German lines. Nixe was badly damaged, and a German team destroyed it with explosive charges during the night of the 24th. Elfriede had overturned; it was righted and recovered from No Man's Land three weeks later by French troops and British tanks, and handed over to the French for examination. Mephisto lay stuck in a crater behind German lines for almost three months. After the area was taken by Australian troops, in July, the tank was towed to the rear by British tanks and, eventually, transported to Australia.

Other actions
In May, A7Vs were used with limited success in an attack on the French near Soissons, during the Third Battle of the Aisne.

On 15 July, at Reims (during the Second Battle of the Marne), the Germans put eight A7Vs and 20 captured Mk IVs against the French lines. Although 10 of the Mk IVs were lost in this action, no A7Vs were lost.

The final use in World War I of A7Vs was in a small but successful action on 11 October 1918, near Iwuy.

Assessment

Germany did not consider the A7V a success and planned other designs. However the end of the war meant none of the other tanks in development or planned ones – such as the Sturmpanzerwagen Oberschlesien and the 120-ton K-Wagen – would be finished .

With only 20 produced, the A7V made only a very minor contribution to the German war effort in World War I, and the approximately 50 captured British Mark IV tanks (renamed Beutepanzer in German operation) the Germans fielded in action during the war outnumbered the A7V. In contrast, the French produced over 3,600 of their light Renault FT, the most numerous tank of World War I, and the British over 2,500 of their Mark I, II, III, IV, V, and V* heavy tanks.

After the war

Two vehicles closely resembling the A7V, one of which was named Hedi, were among several used by Kokampf, a Freikorps tank unit, to quell civil unrest in Berlin in 1919. They were constructed using the chassis from Überlandwagen and armed with four MG08/15 machine guns. It is not known whether the vehicles were armour-plated.

There is a popular myth that France handed over several A7Vs to Polish forces, which used them during the Polish–Soviet War in 1919–1920. However, reliable sources dismiss the idea because the fate of each A7V that saw service in World War I is known and includes no transfers to Poland and there is no known official record or photographic evidence of A7Vs in Polish service.

The design of the A7V is featured on the 1921 Tank Memorial Badge, awarded to German veterans of World War I who served as tank crewmen.

A7V chassis listing

Variants

 A7V-U: (umlaufende Ketten = "tracks running all the way round"). An attempt to reproduce the all-terrain capability of the British tanks, the A7V-U was still based on the Holt chassis but had a rhomboidal hull and all-round tracks. The cab was similar to, but bigger than, that on the A7V and was mounted on top of the forward part of the hull. Two 57 mm guns were carried in sponsons similar to the British type. The prototype was built in June 1918; trials showed that it was nose-heavy and had a high centre of gravity, and the 40-ton weight caused manoeuvrability problems. On the assumption that the problems could be rectified, 20 were ordered in September 1918, the same month work on the design was halted.

Drawings for two improved designs were prepared, but the war ended before any were produced.

Thirty chassis were assigned for completion as Überlandwagen supply carriers, but not all were completed before the end of the war.

 A7V Flakpanzer: Its engine was placed under the driver's compartment, which had a tarpaulin holder to cover the driver from bad weather, ammo boxes were placed around the driver's compartment and beneath the gun themselves. It is claimed that it was armed with two Russian 76 mm divisional gun M1902 field guns on the first two prototypes of the A7V Flakpanzer. The third prototype of the A7V Flakpanzer was armed with a Krupp-Manufactured 7.7cm (3.03 in) leichte Feld Kanone 1896 n/a, only one l.F.K 1896 was mounted onto the vehicle. No paperwork related or mentioning these weapons has been found.

Surviving example

The only surviving A7V is Mephisto, which was abandoned by its crew during the Battle of Villers-Bretonneux in April 1918. It was recovered three months later by British and Australian troops, and taken to Australia in 1919 as a trophy. The vehicle stood outside the old Queensland Museum in Bowen Hills, Brisbane, under an open-sided shelter for many years until being moved into the new Queensland Museum on Southbank in 1986. It was damaged by floodwater in 2011, and taken for restoration to the Workshops Rail Museum, North Ipswich, Queensland. After restoration it was displayed at the Australian War Memorial, Canberra, from 2015 until 2017. It has now been returned to the Queensland Museum.

The cannon from A7V 504 Schnuck is on display at the Imperial War Museum North in Manchester.

Replicas

A running replica was built in 2009 by Bob Grundy of British Military Vehicles, Wigan, UK, a company that specialises in the restoration of old military vehicles. The replica is constructed of plywood and angle iron, using the engine, transmission and tracks from two Fordson County Crawlers – tracked agricultural vehicles – and is painted to represent A7V number 504, Schnuck. It was purchased by The Tank Museum, Bovington, in November 2012. It is on display inside the Museum, and takes part in outdoor displays alongside the Museum's replica British Mark IV that was constructed for the film War Horse.

A static replica is in the Deutsches Panzermuseum in Munster. It is named Wotan, but is largely based on the surviving example, Mephisto.
A mobile mock-up of an A7V appears in the East German feature film Trotz Alledem (1972), the story of Karl Liebknecht and the 1919 Spartacist uprising in Berlin.

A mock-up is among the vehicles at the Milovice Tankodrome in the Czech Republic.

See also
 Tanks in the German Army
 Überlandwagen
 Panzer

References
Notes

Bibliography
 
 
 
 
 
 
 
 
 
 
The A7V Tank can be used in a First Person shooter game called Battlefield 1, Rare female versions of this tank actually had Flamethrowers on the sides instead of machine guns, making it more effective for close combat than soldiers dangerously using them for open exposure.

External links

The First German Tank - Sturmpanzerwagen A7V illustrated (video)
Articles on A7V and variants at Landships II.
Memoir of the British/German tank battle
German Sturmpanzerwagen A7V Tank (video)
"Clearer" video of the A7V Sturmpanzerwagen at YouTube
A7V Replica Demonstration (video)
Excerpt from "Trotz Alledem" showing replica

World War I tanks of Germany
Military vehicles introduced in the 1910s
History of the tank